Lot 17 is a township in Prince County, Prince Edward Island, Canada.  It is part of Richmond Parish. Lot 17 was awarded to Bingham and Theobold Burke in the 1767 land lottery. Half of it had been sold for arrears of quitrent by 1781, and one quarter was granted to Loyalists. Six-thousand acres were sold to Acadians in 1800.

Communities

Incorporated municipalities:

 Linkletter
 Miscouche
 Sherbrooke
 St-Nicholas
 Summerside

Civic address communities:

 Belmont Lot 16
 Central Lot 16
 Miscouche
 North St. Eleanors
 Slemon Park
 St-Nicholas
 Summerside

References

17
Geography of Prince County, Prince Edward Island